Live in Northampton, MA is a live album from ProjeKct Two, an offshoot from King Crimson, released through the King Crimson Collector's Club in June 2001. Recorded on July 1, 1998 in Northampton, Massachusetts.

Track listing
 Vector Shift 10:45
 X-chay-jiz 5:54
 Vector Shift 2:04
 Vector Shift to Planet Belewbeloid 0:28
 Light ConstruKction 5:29
 Heavy ConstruKction 6:02
 The Deception of the Thrush 8:31
 Sus-tayn-z 6:41
 Vector Shift 7:39
 Contrary ConstruKction 7:22
All music composed by Belew, Fripp, Gunn

Personnel
Adrian Belew: V-Drums
Robert Fripp: guitar
Trey Gunn: touch guitar, talker

2001 live albums
Fan-club-release albums
King Crimson Collector's Club albums